James F. Carmichael (July 18, 1939 – July 13, 2016) was an American politician. He was a Republican member of the Ohio House of Representatives, representing the 3rd District from 2000 to 2008. He was also a commissioner for Wayne County. Carmichael died on July 12, 2016.

Born in Washington, Pennsylvania, Carmichael graduated from Shreve High School in Shreve, Ohio. Carmichael served in the Ohio Army  National Guard from 1959 to 1964. He worked for the Dominion East Ohio Gas Company as a district manager. From 1971 to 1979, Carmichael served as mayor of the village of Shreve. Carmichael also served on the Wayne County Board of Elections and was chairman of the elections board.

References

1939 births
2016 deaths
People from Washington, Pennsylvania
People from Shreve, Ohio
County commissioners in Ohio
Mayors of places in Ohio
Republican Party members of the Ohio House of Representatives
21st-century American politicians